The Trial Begins (also known as Rush Hour) is a  2007 Italian crime-drama film written and directed by Vincenzo Marra. It entered the competition at the 64th Venice International Film Festival.

Plot

Cast 

 Fanny Ardant as Caterina
  Michele Lastella as Filippo Costa
  Giulia Bevilacqua as  Francesca
 Augusto Zucchi as Comandante Salvi 
 Antonio Gerardi as Donati 
  Barbara Valmorin as Anna
 Nicola Labate as Patrizi  
 Giacomo Piperno as Rizzi
 Kiara Tomaselli as Filippo's Secretary
 Loredana Martinez  as Donati's Secretary

See also 
 List of Italian films of 2007

References

External links

2007 films
Italian crime drama films
2007 crime drama films
Films directed by Vincenzo Marra
2000s Italian films